In numerical analysis, Laguerre's method is a root-finding algorithm tailored to polynomials. In other words, Laguerre's method can be used to numerically solve the equation  for a given polynomial .  One of the most useful properties of this method is that it is, from extensive empirical study, very close to being a "sure-fire" method, meaning that it is almost guaranteed to always converge to some root of the polynomial, no matter what initial guess is chosen. However, for computer computation, more efficient methods are known, with which it is guaranteed to find all roots (see ) or all real roots (see Real-root isolation).

This method is named in honour of Edmond Laguerre, a French mathematician.

Definition
The algorithm of the Laguerre method to find one root of a polynomial  of degree  is:
 Choose an initial guess 
 For 
 If  is very small, exit the loop
 Calculate 
 Calculate 
 Calculate , where the sign is chosen to give the denominator with the larger absolute value, to avoid catastrophic cancellation.
 Set 
 Repeat until a is small enough or if the maximum number of iterations has been reached.

If a root has been found, the corresponding linear factor can be removed from p. This deflation step reduces the degree of the polynomial by one, so that eventually, approximations for all roots of p can be found. Note however that deflation can lead to approximate factors that differ significantly from the corresponding exact factors. This error is least if the roots are found in the order of increasing magnitude.

Derivation
The fundamental theorem of algebra states that every nth degree polynomial  can be written in the form

such that  where  are the roots of the polynomial. If we take the natural logarithm of both sides, we find that

Denote the derivative by

and the negated second derivative by

We then make what Acton calls a 'drastic set of assumptions', that the root we are looking for, say,  is a certain distance away from our guess , and all the other roots are clustered together some distance away. If we denote these distances by

and

then our equation for  may be written as

and the expression for  becomes

,
where the square root of a complex number is chosen to produce larger absolute value of the denominator, or equivalently, to satisfy:
,
,
where the square root of a complex number is chosen to have a non-negative real part.

If we make the stronger assumption that the terms in  corresponding to the roots  are negligibly small in comparison to the term corresponding to the root , this leads to Newton's method.

Properties

If  is a simple root of the polynomial , then Laguerre's method converges cubically whenever the initial guess  is close enough to the root . On the other hand, if  is a multiple root then the convergence is only linear.  This is obtained with the penalty of calculating values for the polynomial and its first and second derivatives at each stage of the iteration.

A major advantage of Laguerre's method is that it is almost guaranteed to converge to some root of the polynomial no matter where the initial approximation is chosen. This is in contrast to other methods such as the Newton–Raphson method which may fail to converge for poorly chosen initial guesses. This may be considered an advantage or a liability depending on the application to which the method is being used. Empirical evidence has shown that convergence failure is extremely rare, making this a good candidate for a general purpose polynomial root finding algorithm. However, given the fairly limited theoretical understanding of the algorithm, many numerical analysts are hesitant to use it as such, and prefer better understood methods such as the Jenkins–Traub algorithm, for which more solid theory has been developed. Nevertheless, the algorithm is fairly simple to use compared to these other "sure-fire" methods, easy enough to be used by hand or with the aid of a pocket calculator when an automatic computer is unavailable. The speed at which the method converges means that one is only very rarely required to compute more than a few iterations to get high accuracy.

References

Root-finding algorithms